The 1921 Lewisham West by-election was a by-election held on 13 September 1921 for the British House of Commons constituency of Lewisham West.

Vacancy
The by-election was triggered by the death of the serving Unionist Member of Parliament (MP), Sir Edward Coates.

Electoral history
This was considered a normally safe Conservative seat - Coates had been unopposed at the preceding general election;

Candidates
The Unionist candidate was Sir Philip Dawson, who represented the district on London County Council. 
He was opposed by Lieutenant-Commander W. G. Windham of the Anti-Waste League, and
Frank Raffety, an Independent Liberal.

Campaign
Excessive government expenditure was a major theme of the campaign: Dawson ran under the 'Conservative and Anti-Waste' banner, and Raffety also proclaimed himself an opponent of high spending.

No other major issues separated the candidates - all, for instance, declared themselves in favour of proportional representation - and the National Union of Societies for Equal Citizenship, who questioned all three on behalf of women voters, declined to make a recommendation. Dawson won the support of the Middle Classes Union. The only point of controversy consisted of rumours which circulated to the effect that Dawson, who had worked for the Ministry of Munitions during the war, was a foreigner. He responded, according to The Times, by issuing a leaflet entitled 'Dirt' which insisted that he was of pure British stock, and produced details. An article in The Washington Post claimed that he admitted to being the illegitimate son of Field Marshal Sir Neville Chamberlain, and to have originally been given the surname Duvalle.

Result 
The result was a close three-way fight, with Dawson elected with a majority of only 847. British Pathe has newsreel footage of Dawson emerging victorious from the count.
http://www.britishpathe.com/video/sir-philip-dawson/query/election

{{Election box majority|
  |votes      = 847
  |percentage = 3.5
  |change     = N/A
}}

Aftermath
Dawson would go on to hold the seat until his death 17 years later.

 References 

'Anti-Waste Vote In West Lewisham.' The Times'', 15 September 1921 p. 8.

See also 
 List of United Kingdom by-elections
 Lewisham West constituency

By-elections to the Parliament of the United Kingdom in London constituencies
1921 elections in the United Kingdom
Elections in the London Borough of Lewisham
1921 in London